DXVM (99.1 FM), broadcasting as 99.1 iFM, is a radio station owned and operated by the Radio Mindanao Network. It serves as the flagship station of iFM Philippines. The station's studio is located at the RMN Broadcast Center (Canoy Bldg.), Don Apolinario Velez St. cor. Echem St., Cagayan de Oro, and its transmitter is located at Brgy. Bulua, Cagayan de Oro.

History
Established on 1974, DXVM was the first RMN station and the pioneer FM station in the city. It began its broadcasting on November 1, 1976, as 99.1 VM-FM, carrying a CHR/Top 40 format together with other RMN FM stations across the country, excluding DWHB in Baguio (which they carrying smooth jazz format) and DYXL in Cebu (which they carrying easy listening format). On August 16, 1992, the station was relaunched as Smile Radio 99.1 with the slogan "The Voice of Music". It was one of few Smile Radio station with the same format, along with DYHT in Bacolod. On November 23, 1999, Smile Radio was rebranded as 991 VMFM (pronounced as "nine-nine-one") with its slogan "Live It Up!". On May 16, 2002, after almost 2 decades of being CHR/Top 40 station in CDO, the station was relaunched once more as 99.1 iFM and switched to a mass-based format.

References

Radio stations in Cagayan de Oro
Radio stations established in 1974
IFM stations